Apolemia is a genus of siphonophores. It is the only genus in the monotypic family Apolemiidae.

Despite appearing to be a single multicellular organism, they are actually a floating colony of polyps and medusoids, collectively known as zooids.

Discovery
The genus Apolemia, named by Baltic-German physician and naturalist Johann Friedrich von Eschscholtz, was first documented in 1815 with the discovery and description of Apolemia uvaria (the "string jellyfish"), by French naturalist Charles Alexandre Lesueur off the coast of Europe. It was displaying a net-like feeding pattern in the pelagic zone, and was documented to have rows of nematocysts. Few species have been well-defined within the genus otherwise.

Feeding
Apolemia are carnivorous invertebrates, which have been documented to feed on small fish, crustaceans, copepods, other plankton, and even other siphonophores. They do so by extending long, curtain-like nematocyst rows into the water column, for prey to become paralyzed.

Body plan
Siphonophores, such as Apolemia, are generally classified into three major types: Physonectae, Cystonectae, and Calycophorae. Apolemia spp. have been classified as having a Physonectae body plan, containing a pneumatophore towards the surface of the colony, and a nectosome towards the base. Individual zooids orientated in either polyp or medusae forms, such as gastrozooids (medusae) and nectophores (polyps). The orientation of these zooids differs to achieve optimal function within the colony, serving a role in locomotion, propulsion, feeding, and defense. Most Physonectae are described as jellyfish-shaped, though Apolemia proves to be an exception in this instance, aligned more laterally than rounded, such as conventional jellyfish.

Nematocysts
Predatory siphonophores such as Apolemia rely on nematocyst rows to inject toxins and incapacitate prey for the colony to feed. As the Apolemia grow, and chance of the colony splitting increases, movements are reduced and Apolemia abandon the hunting, motile lifestyle for a more sessile, ambush lifestyle, where the coils of threadlike tubes can be most efficiently extended to entrap and incapacitate prey. The newsworthy Apolemia found in 2020, measuring approximately 119 metres, was found coiled in a unique, spiraled shape, increasing the surface area covered in the pycnocline and increasing the potential of trapping prey.

Pneumatophore 
Vertical displacement for the Apolemia is facilitated by the presence of a pneumatophore, a regulating air-float that allows the colony to displace itself both above and below the pycnocline depending on prey availability and ocean conditions. Expanding the air-float increases buoyancy in the water, producing a steep enough contrast for the entire colony to traverse higher in the water column; the inverse is also the case. In addition to assisting in prey location, pneumatophores are integral in the survival of the entire colony, because if water conditions became less optimal due to pH fluctuation, temperature variations or anoxic water zones, the colony is capable of evacuating out of the area.

Nectophore
Horizontal displacement for Apolemia is facilitated by the presence of nectophores. Apolemia utilize nectophores by producing jet-like propulsion by excreting water. Apolemia are colonial organisms and exhibit a high level of communication. Smaller zooids are concentrated at the front of the organisms and are responsible for minute movements such as turning. The larger zooids are located at the back and are responsible for the bulk of the forward momentum.

Species
The following species are classified within the genus Apolemia:
 Apolemia contorta sensu (Margulis, 1976)
 Apolemia lanosa Siebert, Pugh, Haddock & Dunn, 2013
 Apolemia rubriversa Siebert, Pugh, Haddock & Dunn, 2013
 Apolemia uvaria (Lesueur, 1815)
 Apolemia vitiazi (Stepanjants, 1967)

Notable
In 2020 researchers working off the coast of Western Australia came across an Apolemia which had coiled itself into a spiral form. The outer "ring" was estimated to be 47 meters (154 feet) long, with an estimated total length of 119 meters (390 feet).

References

Apolemiidae
Hydrozoan genera
Bioluminescent cnidarians
Taxa named by Johann Friedrich von Eschscholtz